Kadhdhoo or Kaddhoo, Kahdhoo (according to the Admiralty Charts) (Dhivehi: ކައްދޫ އެއަރޕޯޓް) is one of the inhabited islands of Haddummati Atoll, administrative code Laamu.

Geography

Economy
The island is dominated by its airport. Kadhdhoo has several other facilities, including a mosque, hotel, several restaurants, harbour, storage facilities and a gas station (whose owner has the house with the sole family that actually lives on this island).

Transport

Air
This island holds Kadhdhoo Airport, which is the largest airport of the Middle-Maldives District.

Road
The island is connected by causeway to Fonadhoo.

References

Islands of the Maldives